Agelena suboculata is a species of spider in the family Agelenidae, which contains at least 1,350 species of funnel-web spiders . It was first described by Fage in 1938. It is commonly found in Central Africa.

References

suboculata
Spiders of Africa
Spiders described in 1910